Genaro Vázquez Nevarez (born September 18, 1960) is a Mexican professional wrestler and trainer, best known under his ring name Blue Panther. He made his in-ring debut in 1978. Since then, he has worked for most major Mexican professional wrestling promotions, including the Universal Wrestling Association (UWA), Consejo Mundial de Lucha Libre (CMLL) and Asistencia, Asesoría y Administración (AAA). He was one of the first wrestlers to leave CMLL for AAA when it was created in 1992, but returned to CMLL in 1997 where he has competed ever since.

Vázquez's two oldest sons, known as Blue Panther Jr. and Black Panther, are also professional wrestlers, working for CMLL since 2013. A third son referred to as El Hijo de Blue Panther has been introduced to the audience but has not made his in-ring debut. He was the first CMLL World Middleweight Champion and has won the Mexican National Middleweight Championship twice, the CMLL World Trios Championship twice and the Mexican National Trios Championship. He also won the 1999 Torneo Gran Alternativa and the 2000 Leyenda de Plata tournaments.

In his career, he has won the mask of such notable wrestlers as Black Man, Lizmark Jr. and Love Machine. In 2008, he lost his own mask to Villano V and has since had his hair shaved off as a result of losses to Averno and Sam Adonis. Vázquez opened his own gym in the early 1990s, where he was one of the first Mexican professional wrestling trainers to train both men and women.

Professional wrestling career
Blue Panther began wrestling in northern Mexico in the late 1970s before getting noticed by wrestler and promoter René Guajardo in Monterrey. During his initial years in Monterrey, Blue Panther was given several opportunities to show off his in-ring skills and work higher profile matches, in particular with Lucha de Apuestas ("Bet match") wins where he defeated and unmasked La Bestia, Simio Blanco and Oro.

Universal Wrestling Association (1981–1990)
Guarjardo got Blue Panther booked in Universal Wrestling Association (UWA) and Panther made his debut in their main building, El Toreo de Cuatro Caminos in Naucalpan, in 1981. He wrestled on the undercard as a rudo (also referred to as a "heel", those that portray the "bad guys" in wrestling), before getting his first push in 1984 by winning the UWA World Welterweight Championship from veteran worker Matemático.

Panther also began teaming with Black Man on a regular basis around that time, including a November 20, 1984 Lucha de Apuestas win over Los Sombras de Plata, forcing both members of the team to unmask. The team later broke up, leading to a prolonged storyline feud between the two, which included Black Man winning the UWA World Welterweight Championship from Blue Panther on February 9, 1986. The storyline built to a high-profile Lucha de Apuestas match between the two at UWA's main venue, the El Toreon Cuatro Caminos bullfighting arena. After three long falls Blue Panther defeated Black Man, forcing Black Man to unmask and state his real name per lucha libre traditions.

He later defeated Gran Hamada to win his first UWA World Junior Light Heavyweight Championship on November 16, 1986. His first reign lasted 190 days and was ended by El Solar on May 25, 1987. He later regained the championship on February 8, 1988. In May 1988, Blue Panther won another significant match as he defeated Kendo on a UWA show in Tijuana, Baja California to unmask Kendo. On September 18, 1988, Blue Panther's second and final reign as the UWA World Junior Light Heavyweight Champion ended as the UWA bookers decided to have Gran Cochisse win the championship from Blue Panther.

Consejo Mundial de Lucha Libre (1991–1992)
In 1991, Panther began working full-time for Empresa Mexicana de Lucha Libre (EMLL), where he began a feud with Atlantis over the NWA World Middleweight Championship. Although Blue Panther was unsuccessful in his August title challenge, the feud established him as a top rudo in EMLL. Later that same year EMLL changed their name to Consejo Mundial de Lucha Libre (CMLL; "World Wrestling Council") and began holding tournaments for CMLL-branded championships. Blue Panther was one of sixteen competitors entered in the tournament for the CMLL World Middleweight Championship. He defeated Ringo Mendoza in the opening round, El Dandy in the semi-finals and El Satánico in the finals to become the inaugural champion, a sign of CMLL's support of Blue Panther.

Following his championship victory, Blue Panther was programmed in a feud with American Love Machine, a feud that would help establish Panther as one of the top stars of Lucha Libre at the time. The storyline built to the main event of the 36. Aniversario de Arena México show on April 3, 1992. The feud between the two had been so popular that Arena México was sold out, with 18,000 spectators in attendance. To cope with the anticipated fan turn out, CMLL had set up closed-circuit screens to accommodate 8,000 additional spectators. In the third and deciding fall, Love Machine used a move called El Martinete' (a "piledriver"), which under Lucha Libre rules caused him to be disqualified and thus lose the match. The storyline was that Love Machine was not aware of the specific rule, unique to Mexico, and thus was "robbed" of the victory and his mask. After the loss, Love Machine reluctantly unmasked and revealed his real name, Art Barr.

Asistencia, Asesoría y Administración (1992–1997)

In mid-1992 then-CMLL-booker Antonio Peña left CMLL over creative differences with the owner and formed his own company, Asistencia, Asesoría y Administración (AAA). Panther left CMLL and followed Peña to AAA as he was close to Peña. As a result, CMLL declared the CMLL World Middleweight Championship vacant. When Love Machine joined AAA months later the Blue Panther/Love Machine feud resumed. The two met in a mask vs. hair match in July 1993, during which both wrestlers changed sides as Love Machine was helped by Eddy Guerrero turning rudo, while Blue Panther "valiantly" fought back, making Blue Panther a tecnico (a "Face", those that portray the "good guys" in wrestling), as he overcame the odds and defeated Love Machine. Following the turn Barr and Guerrero formed 'Los Gringos Locos,' which soon became the main rudo group of AAA.

On July 23, 1992, Blue Panther won the Mexican National Middleweight Championship from Octagón and held the title for 665 days until Octagón regained the championship April 30, 1994. His second reign lasted a total of 609 days, from May 27, 1994, to January 26, 1996, when El Hijo del Santo won the championship Mexican National Middleweight Championship. Panther teamed up with Fuerza Guerrera and Psicosis to defeat Octagón, Rey Misterio Jr. and Super Muñeco to win the Mexican National Trios Championship.

After the downturn of the Mexican economy, Blue Panther and Fuerza Guerra started their own promotion called Promotora Mexicana de Lucha Libre  (PROMELL; later known as Promo Azteca). The Mexico City Boxing and Professional wrestling commission took control of the Mexican National Trios Championship away from AAA and awarded it to PROMELL instead. This led to the championship being vacated in 1996, before Panther, Fuerza Guerra and El Signo won it by defeating El Brazo, Super Brazo and Super Elektra to win the vacant championship. The original PROMELL struggled to be profitable, which led to Blue Panther briefly returning to AAA in 1997.

Consejo Mundial de Lucha Libre  (1997–present)

In 1998, Panther teamed with Dr. Wagner Jr. and his real-life nephew Black Warrior to form "Los Laguneros" The team won a tournament to win the vacant CMLL World Trios Championship. In 1999, Panther and Wagner teamed to feud with Negro Casas and El Hijo del Santo over the CMLL World Tag Team Championship with an unsuccessful title challenge in September of that year. In 2000 and 2001, Los Laguneros successfully defended their titles against Los Villanos (Villano III, IV, and V) and the team of Negro Casas, Emilio Charles Jr., and Tarzan Boy while Blue Panther had a singles feud with Olímpico.
 
In 2002, Black Warrior left Los Laguneros and the trios championship was vacated. Fuerza Guerrera replaced Black Warrior on the team, and they won another tournament for the CMLL World Trios title but they reigned for only three months before dropping the titles to Black Warrior, Atlantis, and Mr. Niebla. Over time, Blue Panther was getting booked more as a técnico (face) and began to team with former rivals, Atlantis, Lizmark Jr., and Mr. Niebla as La Ola Azul ("The Blue Wave") in a feud with Los Guerreros del Infierno. In 2004, Atlantis and Blue Panther defeated Último Guerrero and Rey Bucanero to win the CMLL World Tag Team Championship. Three months after successfully defending the title against Olímpico and Rey Bucanero, Atlantis and Panther lost the championship to the team of Averno and Mephisto in April 2005. When Atlantis turned rudo, Panther feuded with him intermittently and the two often ripped at each other's masks, hinting at a possible mask vs. mask match. On September 19, 2008, he lost his mask to Villano V. He was unmasked as Genaro Vázquez Nevarez.

In late 2011, Blue Panther began feuding with La Peste Negra ("The Black Plague"; Negro Casas and El Felino), which led to the main event of Sin Piedad on December 16, where Panther faced El Felino in a Hair vs. Hair match. A week prior to the match, Panther was disqualified in a tag team match, after giving El Felino a pile driver. This led to the Distrito Federal Box y Lucha Commission announcing that Panther was suspended for two weeks, starting after December 16 event. At Sin Piedad, El Felino tried to exact revenge on Panther, but was disqualified after the referee caught him going for a pile driver. As a result, El Felino was shaved bald. On March 2, 2012, at Homenaje a Dos Leyendas, Panther and Negro Casas wrestled to a draw in a Lucha de Apuesta and were, as a result, both shaved bald.

In March 2013, Blue Panther was forced to team up with the rudo Rey Escorpión to participate in the 2013 Torneo Nacional de Parejas Increibles ("National Incredible Pairs Tournament"), a tournament where a rudo and a tecnico teams up. The two defeated Delta and Tiger in the first round, but lost to the team of Dragón Rojo Jr. and Niebla Roja in the quarter finals. On September 13, at CMLL's 80th Anniversary Show, Blue Panther lost his hair to Averno in a submissions-only Lucha de Apuestas.

Second generation Panthers (2013–present)

In late 2013, Blue Panther's two oldest sons made their debut for CMLL using the ring names Black Panther and Cachorro (Spanish for "Cub"). Both wore a variation of the mask that their father had worn until 2008. The sons would later be renamed "Blue Panther Jr." and "The Panther" respectively. Blue Panthers and his sons, collectively referred to as Los Divinos Laguneros ("The Divine Laguneros"), would become a regular trio in CMLL with the senior Panther leading the team, helping his sons improve their in-ring skills. Blue Panther and The Panther teamed up for the 2014 Torneo Gran Alternativa ("Great Alternative") tournament, defeating Averno and EL Rebelde in the opening round, before losing to La Sombra and Oro Jr. in the second round. Los Divinos were unsuccessful in their first championship challenge as they lost to Mexican National Trios Champions Los Hijos del Infierno (Ephesto, Luciferno and Mephisto on March 1, 2016. In mid-2017, Blue Panther became involved in a long-running storyline with American wrestler Sam Adonis, who portrayed a pro-Donald Trump and anti-Mexican ring character. Panther stood up to Adonis and defended Mexico as the storyline escalated into the two facing off in a high-profile Lucha de Apuestas match on August 4, 2017. Adonis won the match, forcing Blue Panther to have his hair shaved off.

Blue Panther and Blue Panther Jr. teamed up for a 2018 tournament for the vacant CMLL World Tag Team Championship, but lost in the first round to Diamante Azul and Stuka Jr. In mid-2018, Vázquez announced that a third son was training for an in-ring career, introducing him as "El Hijo de Blue Panther" ("The Son of Blue Panther"). In subsequent months, the Panther changed his name to be known as "Black Panther", taking the name his older brother used previously. In October 2018 CMLL celebrated Vázquez's career as they held the Blue Panther 40th Anniversary Show, with Panther teaming up with fellow Lagunero wrestlers Euforia, Black Warrior and Panterita del Ring defeating Los Tapatía (Máscara Año 2000, El Cuatrero, Forastero and Sansón).

On January 31, 2019, Blue Panther and Black Panther participated in International Wrestling Revolution Group's Guerra de Dinastías ("War of the Dynasties") show where they lost to the father/son team of El Solar and El Hijo del Solar. In April 2020 Panther's third son was introduced to the wrestling world, known under the ring name "Chachorro Lagunero", Spanish for "The Lagunero Puppy".

Professional wrestling trainer
Vazquez opened his own gym in the early 1990s and began training prospective professional wrestlers, being one of the first maestros to train both men and women at his gym. Over the years he has played a part in training hundreds of wrestlers for their in-ring career.

Black Fish
Black Panther
Blue Panther Jr.
Cynthia Moreno
El Oriental
Ephesto
Esther Moreno
Morphosis/Histeria
Texano Jr.
Veneno
Xochitl Hamada

Professional wrestling style
Over the years Vázquez has become known for his "Ras de Lona" ("On the mat") wrestling style, focusing more on holds, takedowns and submission moves than high flying wrestling. The style is personified by his Nudo Lagunero ("The Lagunero Knot") submission move that he created. The "Nudo Lagunero" is a standing figure-four leglock, where Vázquez first wraps a prone opponent's legs across each other, then stretches the opponent's arms through the "knot" of the legs and pulls them up in the air so that all pressure is on the arms to force a submission. In addition to the more complicated Nudo he also uses the Fujiwara armbar submission hold, where Vázquez takes a face down opponent's arm and pulls it back while laying on their back to put the pressure on the shoulder and elbow joints. While he is mostly known for his mat style, he will on occasion execute a dive out of the ring, such as a Topé Suicida where he dives head first through the ropes to hit an opponent.

Personal life
Genaro Vázquez Nevarez was born on September 18, 1960, in the "Lagunero" town in Gómez Palacio, Durango, Mexico. His oldest son was born in the mid-to-late 1980s, known professionally as "Blue Panther Jr.". His second son, known under the ring name "Black Panther", was born in either 1988 or 1989. A third son was introduced in mid-2018 under the ring name "El Hijo de Blue Panther". Vázquez is the uncle of Jesus Toral Lopez, better known as the professional wrestler Black Warrior, and the great uncle of Toral's son Warrior Jr. Vázquez owns and operates his own chiropractic clinic, where he has treated several of his fellow wrestlers as well as patients in general.

Championships and accomplishments
Asistencia Asesoría y Administración / AAA
Mexican National Middleweight Championship (2 times)
Consejo Mundial de Lucha Libre
CMLL World Middleweight Championship (1 time)
CMLL World Tag Team Championship (1 time) – with Atlantis
CMLL World Trios Championship (2 times) – with Black Warrior and Dr. Wagner Jr. (1), Dr. Wagner Jr. and Fuerza Guerrera (1)
Mexican National Trios Championship (2 times) – with Fuerza Guerrera and Psicosis (1), Fuerza Guerrera and El Signo (1)
Torneo Gran Alternativa: 1999 – with Último Guerrero
Leyenda de Azul: 2000
Copa Bobby Bonales: 2009
Pro Wrestling Illustrated
PWI ranked him 56 of the 500 best singles wrestlers of the PWI 500 in 1998
Universal Wrestling Association
UWA World Junior Light Heavyweight Championship (2 times)
UWA World Welterweight Championship (1 time)
World Wrestling Association
WWA Middleweight Championship (1 time)
WWA World Welterweight Championship (1 time)

Luchas de Apuestas record

Footnotes

References

 

 

1960 births
20th-century professional wrestlers
21st-century professional wrestlers
Living people
Masked wrestlers
Mexican male professional wrestlers
People from Gómez Palacio, Durango
Professional wrestling trainers
Professional wrestlers from Durango
Mexican National Middleweight Champions
Mexican National Trios Champions
CMLL World Middleweight Champions
CMLL World Tag Team Champions
UWA World Welterweight Champions
UWA World Junior Light Heavyweight Champions